Inveraray Football Club was a Scottish association football club based in the town of Inveraray, Argyll. The club was founded in 1890 and disbanded in 1895. The club qualified for the Scottish Cup once in 1890–91. The club's home colours were white shirts with navy blue shorts before changing to yellow and black shirts in 1892.

References 

Defunct football clubs in Scotland
Association football clubs established in 1890
1890 establishments in Scotland
Association football clubs disestablished in 1895
1895 disestablishments in Scotland
Football in Argyll and Bute
Inveraray